Singson is a surname. Notable people with the surname include: 

Chavit Singson (born 1941), Filipino politician
Dale Singson (born 1975), Filipino professional basketball player
Gabriel C. Singson, Governor of Bangko Sentral ng Pilipinas (BSP) from 1993 to 1999
Jerry Singson (born 1948), the incumbent Vice Governor of Ilocos Sur
John Singson (born 1991), Filipino businessman
Rogelio Singson, the current Philippine Secretary of Public Works and Highways
Ronald Singson (born 1968), Filipino politician, businessman and concert
Anthony Singson (born 1980), Filipino clinical researcher, partial winner of the largest Powerball Jackpot in lottery history

See also
Simson (disambiguation)
Sing Song (disambiguation)
Singsongs
Swinson (disambiguation)